Hreljin Ogulinski is a village in Karlovac County, Croatia, and is a suburb of Ogulin.

The village is situated on either side of the Dobra River, and consists of several small hamlets. A railroad and the Croatian D42 road pass through Hreljin Ogulinski.

In 2000, the Saint Anthony of Padua Church was constructed.

According to the 2001 Census, there were 595 residents, with 180 family households.

References

Populated places in Karlovac County